Otto Kürschner (29 April 1904 – 31 January 1964) was a German cyclist. He competed in the individual road race at the 1928 Summer Olympics.

References

External links
 

1904 births
1964 deaths
People from Schmalkalden-Meiningen
People from the Province of Saxony
German male cyclists
Cyclists from Thuringia
Olympic cyclists of Germany
Cyclists at the 1928 Summer Olympics